"Till Forever Falls Apart" is a song by American singer-songwriters Ashe and Finneas, and is the third single from Ashe's debut studio album Ashlyn (2021). It was released on March 2, 2021 by Mom + Pop Music. The song was written by the artists alongside Leroy Clampitt and produced by Finneas and Clampitt. Finneas previously co-wrote and produced Ashe's Moral of the Story EPs and its title track.

Background and promotion
In a statement Ashe said "Till Forever Falls Apart" is one of my favorite songs with one of my favorite people. If I’ve learned anything from 'Moral of the Story,' it’s that accepting the hard truth is strangely comforting," she added "Finneas is one of the most talented people I know and it’s fitting to release this song with someone I love so much. I'm lucky to know him and I hope to never know a life without him in it." Finneas responded, saying "Ashe to me, is a timeless artist. Her music will be as relevant and important 30 years from now as it is today. Making music with her has always been an extension of our friendship and I could not love this song more."

The song was accompanied by a music video directed by Sam Bennett. It stars the duo in a California desert dancing in a "vintage ballroom swing style" inspired by Ginger Rogers.

"Till Forever Falls Apart" was performed on Jimmy Kimmel Live! on March 3, 2021.

Critical reception
Heran Mamo wrote for Billboard that "Till Forever Falls Apart" "erupts with the swelling emotion of love and how it can weather any storm, earthquake or natural disaster."

Personnel 
Credits adapted from Tidal.

 Finneas – producer, songwriter
 Leroy Clampitt – producer, songwriter
 Ashlyn Wilson – songwriter
 John Greenham – engineer
 Manny Marroquin – mixer

Charts

Weekly charts

Year-end charts

Certifications

Release history

References

2021 songs
2021 singles
Finneas O'Connell songs
Mom + Pop Music singles
Song recordings produced by Finneas O'Connell
Songs written by Finneas O'Connell
Songs written by Leroy Clampitt
Male–female vocal duets